Alatornio is a former municipality in the province of Lapland, Finland. It was annexed with Tornio in 1973. The 1970, Alatornio had a population of 8,575 people.

Alatornio Church was built in 1797 in the neoclassical style, replacing older buildings which have existed since at least the 14th century. Remnants of a medieval church built in the 15th century can be seen opposite the main entrance today. The church is protected as part of a UNESCO World Heritage Site.

Notable people
Petter Abram Herajärvi (1830-1885), satirical poet, known as the "Preacher of Limeland".
Ville Pörhölä, shot putter, olympic gold medalist

References 

Villages in Finland
Former municipalities of Finland
Tornio